The Most Reverend David John Walkowiak, J.C.D. (born June 18, 1953) is a prelate of the Roman Catholic Church who has been serving as the twelfth bishop of the Diocese of Grand Rapids in Michigan since 2013.

Biography

Early life 
David Walkowiak was born in East Cleveland, Ohio, on June 18, 1952, to Dr. John and Virginia Walkowiak. He has three sisters, and the family is of Polish descent. He attended Saint Bernadette school in Westlake, Ohio and then Cleveland's Saint Ignatius High School.

Walkowiak earned his Bachelor of Arts degree in government and international studies from the University of Notre Dame in Notre Dame, Indianan, in 1975 and his Masters of Divinity degree four years later from Saint Mary Seminary in Wickliffe, Ohio. Beginning in the early 1980s, he studied at the Catholic University of America in Washington, D.C., earning his Licentiate of Canon Law in 1984 and his Doctor of Canon Law degree in 1987.

Priesthood 
Walkowiak was ordained to the priesthood by Bishop James A. Hickey for the Diocese of Cleveland on June 9, 1979. He served the diocese as; 
 Pastoral vicar of Saint Mary Parish in Lorain, Ohio (1979–1984) 
 Vice-chancellor (1988–2006)
 Professor of canon law at Saint Mary Seminary in Wickliffe (1988–2006)
 Pastor of Saint Joan of Arc Parish in Chagrin Falls, Ohio (2006–2013)
Additionally, Walkowiak was a member of the Council of Priests for the diocese and served as an associate judge of its Court of Appeals.

Bishop of Grand Rapids 
On April 18, 2013, Pope Francis accepted the resignation of Bishop Walter A. Hurley of the Diocese of Grand Rapids and appointed Walkowiak as his successor. He was consecrated by Archbishop Allen Vigneron on Walkowiak's 60th birthday (June 18, 2013) at the Cathedral of Saint Andrew in Grand Rapids. Assisting Vigneron as co-consecrators were Bishop Hurley, Apostolic Nuncio Carlo Viganò, and twenty other American bishops.

Walkowiak released a statement on November 27, 2019, in which he supported the decision of Scott Nolan, pastor of St. Stephen Parish in East Grand Rapids, Michigan, to withhold the eucharist from Sara Smolenski.  A town judge, Smolenski told the local media that Nolan notified her before mass that she could not receive communion because of her same-sex marriage.  She also said that Nolan had given her communion the week before.

On May 27, 2021, Walkowiak announced that Pope Francis had laicized William Langlois, a priest from the diocese.  The diocese has received allegations in 2018 that Langlois had sexually abused a parishioner when they were a minor between 1999 and 2006.  The diocese immediately suspended Langlois, notified local authorities, and started an internal investigation.

See also

 Catholic Church hierarchy
 Catholic Church in the United States
 Historical list of the Catholic bishops of the United States
 List of Catholic bishops of the United States
 Lists of patriarchs, archbishops, and bishops

References

External links
Roman Catholic Diocese of Grand Rapids Official Site 

21st-century Roman Catholic bishops in the United States
Religious leaders from Cleveland
1953 births
Living people
American people of Polish descent
People from East Cleveland, Ohio
People from Chagrin Falls, Ohio
People from Lake County, Ohio
People from Lorain, Ohio
Catholics from Ohio
Bishops appointed by Pope Francis
Roman Catholic bishops of Grand Rapids